Izvoare is a commune in Florești District, Moldova. It is composed of three villages: Bezeni, Izvoare and Scăieni.

References

Communes of Florești District